The 2010 Portsmouth City Council election took place on Thursday 6 May 2010 to elect members of Portsmouth City Council in Hampshire, England. The election took place on the same day as a parliamentary general election, and one third of the council (14 seats) was up for election using the first-past-the-post voting system. The Liberal Democrats won a majority of the seats being contested, and remained in overall control of the council, which they had achieved following a series of defections to the party in 2009.

After the election, the composition of the council was:

Liberal Democrats: 24
Conservatives: 16
Labour: 2

Election result
NB: All comparisons are to the 2006 local elections, at which the same tranche of seats were contested.

Ward results
NB: All comparisons are to the 2006 local elections, at which the same tranche of seats were contested.

References

2010
2010 English local elections
May 2010 events in the United Kingdom
2010s in Hampshire